The Republic of Cuba, covering the historical period in Cuban history between 1902 and 1959, was an island country comprised the island of Cuba, as well as Isla de la Juventud (since 1925) and several minor archipelagos. It was located where the northern Caribbean Sea, Gulf of Mexico, and Atlantic Ocean meet. The period began in 1902 following the end of its first U.S. military occupation years after Cuba declared independence in 1898 from the Spanish Empire. This era included various changing governments and US military occupations, and ended with the outbreak of the Cuban Revolution in 1959. During this period, the United States exerted great influence on Cuban politics, notably through the Platt Amendment. The post-1959 communist government refers to this era as the Neocolonial Republic while many Cuban exiles refer to this period as Free Cuba as opposed to the perceived "unfree" socialist state.

The governments of Cuba between independence from Spain and the Revolution have been regarded as client states of the United States. From 1902 to 1934 Cuban and United States law included the Platt Amendment, which guaranteed the US right to intervene in Cuba and placed restrictions on Cuban foreign relations. In 1934, Cuba and the United States signed the Treaty of Relations in which Cuba was obligated to give preferential treatment of its economy to the United States, in exchange the United States gave Cuba a guaranteed 22 percent share of the US sugar market that later was amended to a 49 percent share in 1949. 

The country continued to use the 1940 Constitution until the new constitution was promulgated in 1976.

1902–1933: Early governments

After the Spanish–American War, Spain and the United States signed the 1898 Treaty of Paris, by which Spain ceded Puerto Rico, the Philippines, and Guam to the United States for the sum of $20million (equivalent to $million in ). With the end of United States Military Government (USMG) jurisdiction, Cuba gained formal independence on 20 May 1902, as the Republic of Cuba. Under Cuba's new constitution, the U.S. retained the right to intervene in Cuban affairs and to supervise its finances and foreign relations. Under the Platt Amendment, the U.S. leased the Guantánamo Bay naval base from Cuba.

US occupation, 1906–1909 

Following political purging and a corrupt and rigged election in 1906, the first president, Tomás Estrada Palma, faced an armed revolt by veterans of the war. As in the independence war, Afro-Cubans were overrepresented in the insurgent army of 1906. For them, the August Revolution revived hopes for a 'rightful share' in Cuba's government. On 16 August 1906, fearing the government ready to smash the plot, former Liberation Army general Pino Guerra raised the banner of revolt. Immediately Palma arrested every Liberal politician in reach; the remainder went underground. In an effort to avert intervention Roosevelt sent two emissaries to Havana to seek a compromise between government and opposition. Regarding such impartiality as a vote of censure on his government, Estrada Palma resigned and made his entire cabinet resign too, leaving the Republic without a government and forcing the United States to take control of the island. Roosevelt immediately proclaimed that the USA had been compelled to intervene in Cuba and that their only purpose was to create the necessary conditions for a peaceful election.

1909–1924 
In 1909, home-rule government was restored when José Miguel Gómez was inaugurated as Cuba's second president, while the U.S. continued intervening in Cuban affairs. In 1912, the Partido Independiente de Color attempted to establish a separate black republic in Oriente Province, but was suppressed by General Monteagudo with considerable bloodshed.

Sugar production played an important role in Cuban politics and economics. In the 1910s, during and after World War I, a shortage in the world sugar supply fueled an economic boom in Cuba, marked by prosperity and the conversion of more and more farmland to sugar cultivation. Prices peaked and then crashed in 1920, ruining the country financially and allowing foreign investors to gain more power than they already had. This economic turbulence was called "the Dance of the Millions".

Machado era 

In 1924, Gerardo Machado was elected president. During his administration, tourism increased markedly, and American-owned hotels and restaurants were built to accommodate the influx of tourists. The tourist boom led to increases in gambling and prostitution in Cuba. Machado initially enjoyed support from much of the public and from all the country's major political parties. However, his popularity declined steadily. In 1928 he held an election which was to give him another term, this one of six years, despite his promise to serve only for one term.

1933–1958: Unrest and new governments

Revolution of 1933
The Wall Street Crash of 1929 led to precipitous drops in the price of sugar, political unrest, and repression. Protesting students, known as the Generation of 1930, and a clandestine terrorist organization known as the ABC, turned to violence in opposition to the increasingly unpopular Machado.

US ambassador Sumner Welles arrived in May 1933 and began a diplomatic campaign which involved "mediation" with opposition groups in including the ABC. This campaign significantly weakened Machado's government and, backed with the threat of military intervention, set the stage for a regime change.

A general strike (in which the Popular Socialist Party sided with Machado), uprisings among sugar workers, and an army revolt forced Machado into exile in August 1933. He was replaced by Carlos Manuel de Céspedes y Quesada, son of Cuban patriot Carlos Manuel de Céspedes and former ambassador to the US.

In September 1933, the Sergeants' Revolt, led by Sergeant Fulgencio Batista, overthrew Céspedes. General Alberto Herrera served briefly as president ( 12–13 August) followed by Carlos Manuel de Céspedes y Quesada from 13 August until 5 September 1933. A five-member executive committee (the Pentarchy of 1933) was chosen to head a provisional government. They were ousted by a student-led organization, the Student Directory, which appointed Ramon Grau San Martin as provisional president and passed various reforms during the ensuing One Hundred Days Government. Grau resigned in 1934, after which Batista dominated Cuban politics for the next 25 years, at first through a series of puppet-presidents. The period from 1933 to 1937 was a time of "virtually unremitting social and political warfare".

Constitution of 1940
A new constitution was adopted in 1940, which engineered radical progressive ideas, including the right to labor and health care. Batista was elected president in the same year, holding the post until 1944. He is so far the only non-white Cuban to win the nation's highest political office. His government carried out major social reforms. Several members of the Communist Party held office under his administration. Cuban armed forces were not greatly involved in combat during World War II, although president Batista suggested a joint U.S.-Latin American assault on Francoist Spain to overthrow its authoritarian regime.

Batista adhered to the 1940 constitution's structures preventing his re-election. Ramon Grau San Martin was the winner of the next election, in 1944. Grau further corroded the base of the already teetering legitimacy of the Cuban political system, in particular by undermining the deeply flawed, though not entirely ineffectual, Congress and Supreme Court. Carlos Prío Socarrás, a protégé of Grau, became president in 1948. The two terms of the Auténtico Party saw an influx of investment which fueled a boom and raised living standards for all segments of society and created a prosperous middle class in most urban areas.

Batista dictatorship

Before presidential election in 1952, Batista staged a coup. Back in power and receiving financial, military and logistical support from the United States government, Batista suspended the 1940 Constitution and revoked most political liberties, including the right to strike. He outlawed the Cuban Communist Party in 1952. He then aligned with the wealthiest landowners who owned the largest sugar plantations, and presided over a stagnating economy that widened the gap between rich and poor Cubans. Eventually it reached the point where most of the sugar industry was in U.S. hands, and foreigners owned 70% of the arable land. As such, Batista's repressive government then began to systematically profit from the exploitation of Cuba's commercial interests, by negotiating lucrative relationships with both the American Mafia, who controlled the drug, gambling, and prostitution businesses in Havana, and with large U.S.-based multinational companies who were awarded lucrative contracts. To quell the growing discontent amongst the populace—which was subsequently displayed through frequent student riots and demonstrations—Batista established tighter censorship of the media, while also using his Bureau for the Repression of Communist Activities secret police to carry out wide-scale violence, torture and public executions. These murders mounted in 1957, as socialism became more influential. Many people were killed, with estimates ranging from hundreds to about 20,000 people killed. Cuba had Latin America's highest per capita consumption rates of meat, vegetables, cereals, automobiles, telephones and radios, though about one third of the population was considered poor and enjoyed relatively little of this consumption.

While Cuba had the highest ratio of hospital beds to population in Latin America, around 80% of these beds were located in the city of Havana, there was only one rural hospital and it was equipped with only 10 beds. In 1951 the World Bank reported that between 80–90% of children in rural areas suffered from some form of intestinal parasites, in 1956 about 13% of the rural population had a history of typhoid and 14% at one point had tuberculosis. A study conducted in 1959 by public health authorities found that throughout the country around 72% of the population was afflicted with parasitism and in the rural areas this percentage was as high as 86.54%. Only 11% of farm worker families drank milk, and rural infant mortality stood at 100 per 1000 live births. Only 1 in 4 peasants were able to afford regularly eating meat, eggs and fish and chronic unemployment was at 25%. Cuba was a very unequal society with a mere 8% of landowners owning approximately 75% of the land, the bottom fifth of the population took in 2% of the national income meanwhile one-fifth of the population took in 58% of the national income this was one of the lowest rates for the bottom 20% in the world then and even now.

Cuba was also under a lot of influence from the United States to the point where the US controlled 80% of Cuba's trade. In 1959 around 40% of Cuban sugar land, almost all the cattle ranches, 90% of mines and 80% of the utilities were owned by American firms.

In 1958, Cuba was a relatively well-advanced country by Latin American standards, and in some cases by world standards. On the other hand, Cuba was affected by perhaps the largest labor union privileges in Latin America, including bans on dismissals and mechanization. They were obtained in large measure "at the cost of the unemployed and the peasants", leading to disparities. Between 1933 and 1958, Cuba extended economic regulations enormously, causing economic problems. Unemployment became a problem as graduates entering the workforce could not find jobs. The middle class, which was comparable to that of the United States, became increasingly dissatisfied with unemployment and political persecution. The labor unions supported Batista until the very end. Batista stayed in power until he was forced into exile in December 1958.

Tourism
Between 1915 and 1930, Havana hosted more tourists than any other location in the Caribbean. The influx was due in large part to Cuba's proximity to the United States, where restrictive prohibition on alcohol and other pastimes stood in stark contrast to the island's traditionally relaxed attitude to leisure pursuits. Such tourism became Cuba's third largest source of foreign currency, behind the two dominant industries of sugar and tobacco. Cuban drinks such as the daiquiri and mojito became common in the United States during this time, after Prohibition was repealed.

A combination of the Great Depression of the 1930s, the end of prohibition, and World War II severely dampened Cuba's tourist industry, and it wasn't until the 1950s that numbers began to return to the island in any significant force. During this period, American organized crime came to dominate the leisure and tourist industries, a modus operandi outlined at the infamous Havana Conference of 1946. By the mid-1950s Havana became one of the main markets and the favourite route for the narcotics trade to the United States. Despite this, tourist numbers grew steadily at a rate of 8% a year and Havana became known as "the Latin Las Vegas".

References

External links
 
 https://archive.org/details/in.ernet.dli.2015.159198/page/n9/mode/2up

 
Republic 1902
Cuba 1902
Cuba 1902
Republic 1902
.
.
.
.
.
.
States and territories established in 1902
States and territories disestablished in 1959
1902 establishments in Cuba
1959 disestablishments in Cuba
Republic 1902